John Potts may refer to:

John Potts (athlete) (1906–1987), English Olympic athlete
John Potts (American frontiersman), a member of the Lewis and Clark Expedition
John Potts (baseball) (1887–1962), Major League Baseball right fielder
John Potts (British politician) (1861–1938), British Labour Party politician
John Potts (cricketer) (born 1960), English cricketer
John Potts (engraver) (1791–1841), English engraver
John Potts (footballer) (1904–1986), English footballer
John Potts (Pennsylvanian) (1710–?), founder of Pottstown, Pennsylvania
Sir John Potts, 1st Baronet (1592–1673), English politician

See also
John Pott (died 1645), 17th-century Colonial Governor of Virginia at the Jamestown settlement
Johnny Pott (born 1935), American professional golfer